Józef Berger (14 March 1901 in Orłowa – 11 June 1962 in Bratislava) was a Polish Lutheran pastor, theologian and politician from the region of Zaolzie, Czechoslovakia. He was a member of the Polish People's Party, a political party active amongst middle-class Lutherans of the Polish minority in interbellum Czechoslovakia.

In 1920 Berger graduated from Juliusz Słowacki Polish Grammar School in Orłowa, and in 1924 from the Theological Faculty of the University of Warsaw, where he studied the Protestant theology.

He was actively engaged in the life of the Polish community in Zaolzie. It was mainly thanks to him that the new Lutheran church was built in 1932 in Czeski Cieszyn. From its foundation in 1922, he was one of the leading activists of the Polish People's Party in Czechoslovakia. After the annexation of Zaolzie region to Poland in 1938, President Ignacy Mościcki named him a deputy of the Silesian Parliament, where Berger was a deputy until the outbreak of World War II.

During the Nazi occupation he was interned in the Auschwitz and Dachau concentration camps.

From 1945 to 1952, he worked as a pastor at the Lutheran church in Czeski Cieszyn. On 25 June 1950 he was elected a superintendent of the Silesian Evangelical Church of the Augsburg Confession. In 1952, Berger was designated a professor of systematic theology at the Theological Academy in Modra near Bratislava and moved permanently to Bratislava.

Berger was also active in the tourist and skiing organizations of the Polish minority in Czechoslovakia. In his free time, he also enjoyed painting, covering mostly the landscapes of his native region.

Footnotes

References
 

1901 births
1962 deaths
Polish Lutheran theologians
Polish politicians
Polish people from Zaolzie
Members of Silesian Parliament
Auschwitz concentration camp survivors
Dachau concentration camp survivors
People from Orlová
University of Warsaw alumni
Czech Lutheran clergy
20th-century Protestant theologians